The New York Eagles were a professional soccer franchise that played in the American Soccer League from 1978 to 1981, with a one-year hiatus in 1980.  The franchise played its first season in Mount Vernon, New York, then moved to Albany, New York for the 1979 and 1981 seasons, playing at Albany's Bleecker Stadium.

The Eagles' top scorer, Vogislav "Billy" Boljevic, led the ASL in scoring in both 1981.  The Eagles sat out the 1980 season due to financial constraints.  The franchise made the playoffs in both the 1979 and 1981 seasons, but did not advance past the first game in either playoff appearance.

Yearly Awards
ASL Season MVP
1981 – Billy Boljevic

ASL All-Star Team Selection
1979 – Andjelko Tesan, Branko Sematovic
1981 – Billy Boljevic

ASL Leading Goal Scorer
1981 – Billy Boljevic (25 Goals)

ASL Leading Points Scorer
1981 – Billy Boljevic (59 Points)

Year-by-year

Coaches
Mike Rybak (1981)
Gjelosh Nikac (1979) 
George Vizvary (1978)
Dragoslav Šekularac (1978)

Players
Guillermo Ambrosini
Billy Boljevic
Momcilo Bozevic
Howie Charbonneau
Jose Cristaldo
Simon Curanaj
Waldir DeSouza
Keith Gehling
Hranislav Hadizitonic
Ricky Kren
Miodrag Lacevic
Abdullah Nezaj
Leo Ramas
Salvatore Scalica
Branko Sematovic
Lesh Shkreli
Robert Steinberg
Andjelko Tesan
Clyde Watson

References

Eagles
Defunct soccer clubs in New York (state)
American Soccer League (1933–1983) teams
Sports in Albany, New York
1978 establishments in New York (state)
1981 disestablishments in New York (state)
Association football clubs disestablished in 1981
Association football clubs established in 1978